A moral injury is an injury to an individual's moral conscience and values resulting from an act of perceived moral transgression on the part of themselves or others, which produces profound feelings of guilt or shame—and in some cases a profound sense of betrayal and anger toward colleagues, commanders, the organization, politics, or society at large—moral disorientation, and societal alienation.

Moral injury is most often studied in the context of military personnel. The term has also been applied to frontline health workers during the COVID-19 pandemic who have had to deal with extremely stressful situations in which they were unable to provide care at a level that they considered appropriate, to people involved in accidents, and to people who have been raped or abused.

Definition
The concept of moral injury emphasizes the psychological, social, cultural, and spiritual aspects of trauma. According to the US Department of Veterans Affairs, the concept is used in literature with regard to the mental health of military veterans who have witnessed or perpetrated an act in combat that transgressed their deeply held moral beliefs and expectations.

Historical development
In 1984, the term moral distress was first conceptualized by philosopher Andrew Jameton in his book on nursing issues, Nursing Practice: The Medical Issues to describe the psychological conflict nurses experienced during "ethical dilemmas". He wrote that "moral distress arises when one knows the right thing to do, but institutional constraints make it nearly impossible to pursue the right course of action."

In the 1990s the term moral injury was coined by psychiatrist Jonathan Shay and colleagues based upon numerous narratives presented by military/veteran patients given their perception of injustice as a result of leadership malpractice. Shay's definition of moral injury had three components: 'Moral injury is present when (i) there has been a betrayal of what is morally right, (ii) by someone who holds legitimate authority and (iii) in a high-stakes situation. As of 2002, Shay defined moral injury as stemming from the "betrayal of 'what's right' in a high-stakes situation by someone who holds power."

In 2009, the term moral injury was modified by Brett Litz and colleagues as "perpetrating, failing to prevent, or bearing witness to acts that transgress deeply held moral beliefs and expectations may be deleterious in the long term, emotionally, psychologically, behaviorally, spiritually, and socially" (2009, p. 695). According to Litz et al., the term moral injury had been developed in response to the inadequacy of mental health diagnoses e.g., Post-traumatic stress disorder, to encapsulate the moral anguish service members were experiencing after returning home from war. Unlike PTSD's focus on fear-related symptoms, moral injury focuses on symptoms related to guilt, shame, anger, and disgust. The shame that many individuals face as a result of moral injury may predict symptoms of posttraumatic stress disorder.

As of 2017, no systematic reviews or meta-analyses exist on the construct of moral injury, although a literature review of the various definitions since the inception of moral injury has been undertaken, as well as psychological and interdisciplinary literature reviews of how moral injury develops and the factors involved.

In 2019, researchers surveyed previous literature and expertise to compile a list of events that could distress civilians at a level consistent with moral injury. Examples include causing a car accident or experiencing sexual assault, but researchers emphasize that not everyone will respond to an event in the same way.

In the early 2020s moral injury emerged as one of the explanations for the wave of employee resignations across industries. In particular, Ludmila Praslova proposed that moral injury might be a better explanation for a segment of resignations and employee distress than burnout, and provided suggestions for organizational-level interventions.

Military perspective 
To understand the development of the construct of moral injury, it is necessary to examine the history of violence and the psychological consequences. Throughout history, humans have been killing each other, and have shown great reluctance in doing so. Literature on warfare emphasizes the moral anguish soldiers feel in combat, from modern military service members to ancient warriors. Ethical and moral challenges are inherent to warfare. Soldiers in the line of duty may witness catastrophic suffering and severe cruelty, causing their fundamental beliefs about humanity and their worldview to be shaken.

Service members who are deployed into war zones are usually exposed to death, injury, and violence. Military service members represent the population with the highest risk of developing post-traumatic stress disorder. PTSD was first included in the third edition of the Diagnostic and Statistical Manual of Mental Disorders, the manual classifying mental health disorders published by the American Psychiatric Association, to begin to address the symptoms that Vietnam veterans exhibited after their wartime experiences. As PTSD has developed as a diagnosis, it requires that individuals are either directly exposed to death, threatened death, serious injury, or sexual violence, witness it in person, learn about it occurring indirectly to a close relative or friend, or are repeatedly exposed to aversive details of traumatic events. PTSD includes four symptom clusters, including intrusion, avoidance, and negative mood and thoughts, and changes in arousal and reactivity. Individuals with PTSD may experience intrusive thoughts as they re-experience the traumatic events, as well as avoiding stimuli that reminds them of the traumatic event, and have increasingly negative thoughts and moods. Additionally, individuals with PTSD may exhibit irritable or aggressive, self-destructive behavior, and hypervigilance, amongst other arousal-related symptoms.

Moral injury can also be experienced by warriors who have been transgressed against. The injury may in those cases, which are often about transgressions by the soldier and others (e.g. the commander) at the same time, include a sense of betrayal and anger. For example, when one goes to war believing that the purpose of the war is to eradicate weapons of mass destruction, but finds that not to be the case, or when the soldier is sent to war with an impossible mandate rendering him powerless in the face of human suffering, the soldier can experience moral injury. Those who have seen and experienced death, mayhem, destruction, and violence and have had their worldviews shattered – the sanctity of life, safety, love, health, peace, etc. – can also suffer moral injury.

The exposure to violence during war times make military and veteran population at a higher risk of developing moral injury. According to statistics collected in 2003, 32 percent of American service members deployed to Iraq and to Afghanistan were responsible for the death of an enemy, 60 percent had witnessed both women and children who were either ill or wounded to whom they were unable to provide aid, and 20 percent reported being responsible for the death of a non-combatant. Similar work has been conducted in a Canadian military context – out of Canadian Armed Forces personnel deployed to the mission to Afghanistan, more than half endorsed a traumatic event that was conceptually linked to moral injury.  Specifically, 43 percent saw ill or injured women or children who they were unable to help; 7 percent felt responsible for the death of Canadian or ally personnel, and 38 percent had difficulty distinguishing between combatants and noncombatants. Controlling for other fear-based deployment related stressors, exposure to such potentially morally injurious events have been related to increased prevalence of PTSD and depression in military personnel.

During times of war a service member's personal ethical code may clash with what is expected of them during war. Approximately 27 percent of deployed soldiers have reported having an ethical dilemma to which they did not know how to respond. Research has shown that longer and more frequent deployments can result in an increase in unethical behaviors on the battlefield. This is problematic considering deployment lengths have increased for the war in Iraq and Afghanistan. During times of war the military promotes an ethical pardon on the killing of an enemy, going against the typical moral code for many service members. While a service member is deployed, killing of the enemy is expected and often rewarded. Despite this, when a service member returns home the sociocultural expectations are largely different from when they were deployed. The ethical code back home has not changed, making the transition from deployment to home difficult for some service members. This clash in a personal ethical code and the ethical code and expectations of the military can further increase a service member's deep-seated feelings of shame and guilt for their actions abroad.

In healthcare professionals 
Moral distress among healthcare professionals was first conceptualized in 1984 by Andrew Jameton. The concept was gradually explored over the subsequent 30 years in both nursing and veteran literature, though as above the definitions were slightly different. In the healthcare literature, moral injury refers to the accumulation of negative effects by continued exposure to morally distressing situations.
In 2000 the concept of moral distress being generated by systemic issues had been termed, "the ethical canary". to draw attention to the sensation of moral distress signaling a need for systemic change.

In 2018, it was suggested that moral injury can occur among physicians and other care providers which affect their mental health and well-being. The concept of moral injury in healthcare is the expansion of the discussion around compassion fatigue and 'burnout'
was first discussed by Simon G. Talbot and Wendy Dean.

Physicians in the United States were caught in situations that prevented them from doing what they perceive is the right course of action, i.e. taking care of the patient well. Instead, they were caught in double and triple and quadruple binds between their obligations of electronic health records, their own student loans, the requirements for patient load through the hospital and number of procedures performed. Often, physicians are trained to the "gold standard" but due to institutional double-binds, cannot actually execute that best-in-class treatment.

Nurses, particularly those who work in intensive-care settings, are highly likely to experience moral injury or burnout. The injury stems from the proximity to secondary trauma and the inability provide patients with the level of care to which they are called.

As of 2018, moral injury has been studied in medical students working within the NHS. In her TED talk in October 2019, Sammy Batt-Rawden argued that doctors come to psychological harm as a result of not being able to give patients the care that they need in an under-resourced NHS.

Since the beginning of the COVID-19 pandemic in 2020, healthcare workers in the United States in particular have been faced with decisions like rationing care while hospital policy and insurance constraints remain, without support or training on how to psychologically process the toll these decisions can take. Driven by changes in health care reimbursement structures, systems were “optimized” to the point that they were continually running at what felt like full capacity, with precious little slack to accommodate minor surges, much less one the magnitude of a global pandemic. As such, COVID-19 has only exacerbated an already deeply challenged system.

In first responders 
The concept of moral injury has more recently also been discovered among police, and likely exists among firefighters as well and other forms as first responders work and should include such Emergency Medical Services, legal defenders/lawyers, and Child/Adult Protective Services. Professions with non-human subjects such as veterinarians are also beginning to be studied.

Psychological perspective
 
Brett Litz and colleagues define moral injury as "perpetrating, failing to prevent, bearing witness to, or learning about acts that transgress deeply held moral beliefs and expectations." Litz and colleagues focus on the cognitive, behavioral, and emotional aspects of moral injury, positing that cognitive dissonance occurs after a perceived moral transgression resulting in stable internal global attributions of blame, followed by the experience of shame, guilt, or anxiety, causing the individual to withdraw from others. The result is increased risk of suicide due to demoralization, self-harming, and self-handicapping behaviors.

Psychological risk factors which make an individual more prone to moral injury include neuroticism and shame-proneness. Protective factors include self-esteem, forgiving supports, and belief in the just-world hypothesis.

Social, cultural and political perspective
Research by anthropologist Tine Molendijk integrates insights from psychology, philosophy, theology and social sciences to achieve a holistic understand of not only the psychological but also the ethical, spiritual/existential, organizational, political and societal dimensions of moral injury. Her research has shown that as unresolved conflicts at the political level create potentially morally injurious situations for soldiers on the ground, "experiences of institutional betrayal" and "a resultant search for reparations" by veterans can also be part of moral injury. It further demonstrates that not only public condemnation of veterans, but public heroification, too, may contribute to moral injury, given that both are generally experienced by veterans as alienating distortions of their war experience, meaning that both may entail an "injustice" being done to the experience.

As the causes of moral injury lie not only in the individual but also at the organizational, political and societal levels, Molendijk further argues, solutions should be sought at these levels as well. The practical implications of a holistic approach to moral injury, for instance, include that we need 'a more elaborate moral vocabulary, the decision-making framework of the Just War Tradition, and purification and reintegration practices'.

Spiritual perspective
Rita Nakashima Brock and Gabriella Lettini emphasize moral injury as "…souls in anguish, not a psychological disorder." This occurs when veterans struggle with a lost sense of humanity after transgressing deeply held moral beliefs. The Soul Repair Center at Brite Divinity School is dedicated to addressing moral injury from this spiritual perspective.

Treatment
While moral injury can be experienced by people other than military service members, research has paid special attention to moral injury in military populations. Seeking professional mental health help for moral injury may present with some challenges, particularly for military personnel. Moral injury is frequently associated with socially-withdrawing emotions, such as guilt and shame. These emotions may further reduce the likelihood of individuals reaching out for help in the fear of being rejected or judged by others. Additionally, military personnel may be hesitant to seek help due to actual or perceived career repercussions. Recent research on this topic showed that among active deployed military personnel, those who were exposed to potentially morally injurious experiences were more likely to avoid military mental health services and instead seek help from a professional in a civilian health care system.

According to Shay, the process of recovery should consist of "purification" through the "communalization of trauma." Shay places special importance on communication through artistic means of expression. Moral injury could only be absolved when "the trauma survivor... [is] permitted and empowered to voice their experience....". Fully coming "home" would mean integration into a culture where one is accepted, valued and respected, has a sense of place, purpose, and social support.

According to Litz for this to occur, there needed to be openness on the part of civilians to hear the veterans' experiences without prejudice. The culture in the military emphasizes a moral and ethical code that normalizes both killing and violence in times of war. Litz and colleagues (2009) have hypothesized a modified version of CBT that addresses three key areas of moral injury: "life-threat trauma, traumatic loss, and moral injury Marines from the Iraq and Afghanistan wars." Despite this, decisions made by service members who engage in killing or violence through this cultural lens would still experience psychological and spiritual impact.

It is hypothesized that treating the underlying shame associated with service member's symptoms of PTSD is necessary and it has been shown that allowing feelings of shame to go untreated can have deleterious effects. This can make the identification of moral injury in a service member difficult because shame tends to increase slowly over time. Shame has been linked to complications such as interpersonal violence, depression, and suicide. 
 
Neurological research suggests that there are differences in how physical threat and moral injury affect the brain. In 2015, Gaudet and colleagues wrote that treatment interventions are lacking and new treatment interventions specific to moral injury are necessary, and that it was not enough to treat moral injury in the same way that depression or PTSD are commonly treated. 
Treatments for PTSD have been described as “backwards-acting” in that they tend to focus on reframing negative thoughts about a past trauma. For someone who has violated their moral code by doing or failing to do something, such reframing may not be appropriate or effective. For example, many front line health workers during the COVID-19 pandemic have had to deal with extremely stressful situations in which they were unable to provide care at a level which they considered appropriate. Those experiencing moral injury may be better served by “forward-looking” treatment that supports “adaptive disclosure”, combining acceptance of responsibility for their past choices with a focus on their ability to contribute in the future, and where appropriate, steps towards reparation.

Treating moral injury has been described as "soul repair" due to the nature of moral anguish.  “Spiritually integrated” therapies for moral injury that deal with feelings of guilt and shame often draw upon religious traditions. 
In spite of the lack of research on the treatment of moral injury, factors such as humility, gratitude, respect and compassion have shown to either be protective or provide for hope.

References

External links

Moral Injury: A Resource to Advance Clinical Care and Science
Moral Injury: The Hidden Wound to the Soul
Military Sexual Assault is a Moral Injury
Why “Moral Injury,” Like “PTSD,” Is a Term That Applies to Far More Than Our Soldiers, and Why That’s Important to All of Us
Beyond Surviving: On Sexual Violence, Moral Injury, and Jessica Jones
Moral Injury

Mental health
Military psychology
Moral psychology
Suffering